Ezgi Çağlar (born July 3, 1991) is a Turkish women's football goalkeeper currently playing in the Turkish Women's First Football League for Fenerbahçe in İstanbul with jersey number 1. She is member of the Turkey women's national team since 2007.

Playing career

Club

Ezgi Çağlar began playing football at Bucaspor after obtaining her license on April 28, 2006. Three years later, she moved to the high school girls' club Düvenciler Lisesispor in Lüleburgaz for the 2009–10 season. She played two seasons there, capped 36 times and scored also two goals.

On August 5, 2011, Çağlar was transferred by the Istanbul-based club Ataşehir Belediyespor, which had become newly league champion. During the 2011–12 UEFA Women's Champions League – Group 4 matches, which started one week later of joining her new club, she had to sit on the reserve bench.  At the end of the next season, she enjoyed her first championship. Çağlar debuted in the UEFA Women's Champions League on August 11, 2012, playing at the 2012–13 UEFA Women's Champions League – Group 1 match against the Lithuanian side Gintra Universitetas. She took part also in the following two matches of the tournament.

For the 2015–16 season, she signed with Kireçburnu Spor, which was recently promoted to the Women's First League. In the second half of the 2016–17 season, Çağlar returned to her former club Ataşehir Belediyespor. In October 2017, Çağlar was transferred by the Diyarbakır-based club Amed SFK, which were recently promoted to play in the 2017-18 Turkish Women's First Football League. In the 2018–19 First League season, Çağlar returned to her former club Kireçburnu Spor.

International

Çağlar was called up to the Turkey girls' U-17 national team to play at the 2008 UEFA Women's U-17 Championship – Group 6 matches. She debuted in the match against the Irish girls on October 19, 2007. She capped three times in total for the girls' youth nationals.

She made her first appearance in the Turkey women's U-19 national team on September 27, 2007, playing at the 2008 UEFA Women's Under-19 Championship qualifying round match against Poland. She further took part in the qualifying round matches of the 2009 UEFA Women's Under-19 Championship and the 2010 UEFA Women's Under-19 Championship. She capped 9 times for the junior women national team.

Çağlar debuted in the national team in the friendly match against Bulgaria on May 5, 2007. As of end 2013, she capped 29 times, mostly in friendly games. She is held as a reserve goalkeeper.

Career statistics
.

Honours 
Turkish Women's First League
 Bucaspor
 Runners-up (2): 2007–08, 2008–09

 Ataşehir Belediyespor
 Winners (1): 2011–12
 Runners-up (3): 2012–13, 2013–14, 2014–15

 Fatih Vatan Spor
 Runners-up (1): 2020–21

Turkish Women's Second League
 Düvenciler Lisesispor
 Winners (1): 2009–10

References 

Living people
1991 births
People from Konak
Footballers from İzmir
Turkish women's footballers
Turkey women's international footballers
Women's association football goalkeepers
Bucaspor women's players
Lüleburgaz 39 Spor players
Ataşehir Belediyespor players
Kireçburnu Spor players
Amed S.K. (women) players
ALG Spor players
Fatih Vatan Spor players
Fenerbahçe S.K. women's football players
Turkish Women's Football Super League players
21st-century Turkish sportswomen